Sandhipudi is a village of in East Godavari district of the Indian state of Andhra Pradesh. It is located in Alamuru mandal of Rajahmundry revenue division.

References

Villages in East Godavari district